Larken is a surname. Notable people with the surname include:

 Anthea Larken (born 1938), British director of the Women's Royal Naval Service
 Edmund Larken (1809–1895), British cleric and Christian socialist
 Frank Larken (1875–1953), British Royal Navy officer
 Hubert Larken (1874–1964), British Anglican priest
 Sheila Larken (born 1944), American actress

See also
 Larkin (disambiguation)

Surnames of English origin